Edda Kainz (born 24 February 1940) is an Austrian alpine skier. She competed in the women's downhill at the 1964 Winter Olympics.

References

1940 births
Living people
Austrian female alpine skiers
Olympic alpine skiers of Austria
Alpine skiers at the 1964 Winter Olympics
People from Immenstadt
Sportspeople from Swabia (Bavaria)